Klook's Clique is an album led by drummer Kenny Clarke recorded in 1956 and first released on the Savoy label.

Reception

The Allmusic reviewer David Szatmary described as "An indispensable session by the bop pioneer".

Track listing
 "Volcano" (Kenny Clarke) – 6:01
 "La Porta-Thority" (John LaPorta) – 5:54
 "I Hear a Rhapsody" (George Fragos, Jack Baker, Dick Gasparre) – 4:48
 "Will Wail" (LaPorta) – 7:04
 "Yesterdays" (Jerome Kern, Otto Harbach) – 5:58
 "Play Fiddle Play" (Arthur Altman, Emery Deutsch, Jack Lawrence) – 4:32

Personnel
Kenny Clarke – drums
Donald Byrd – trumpet
John LaPorta – alto saxophone
Ronnie Ball – piano
Wendell Marshall – bass

References

Savoy Records albums
Kenny Clarke albums
1956 albums
Albums produced by Ozzie Cadena
Albums recorded at Van Gelder Studio